Easy Come, Easy Go is a 1967 American musical comedy film starring Elvis Presley. Hal Wallis produced the film for Paramount Pictures, and it was Wallis' final production with Presley. The film co-starred Dodie Marshall, Pat Harrington, Jr., Pat Priest, Elsa Lanchester, and Frank McHugh. (It was McHugh's last feature film.) The movie reached #50 on the Variety magazine national box office list in 1967.

Easy Come, Easy Go, Presley's twenty-third film, was released on March 22, two weeks before his twenty-fourth, Double Trouble, which was released on April 5. However, Double Trouble was filmed before Easy Come, Easy Go.

Plot
United States Navy officer Lieutenant Junior Grade (j.g.) Ted Jackson (Elvis Presley) is a former U.S. Navy explosive ordnance disposal officer who divides his time between twin careers as a deep-sea diver and nightclub singer. Ted discovers what he believes could be a fortune in Spanish gold aboard a sunken ship and sets out to rescue it with the help of go-go dancing yoga expert Jo Symington (Dodie Marshall) and friend Judd Whitman (Pat Harrington, Jr.). Gil Carey (Skip Ward), however, is also after the treasure and uses his girlfriend Dina Bishop (Pat Priest) to foil Ted's plans.

Presley sings six songs in the movie: the title song, "I'll Take Love", "Sing You Children", "You Gotta Stop", "Yoga Is as Yoga Does" in a duet with Elsa Lanchester, and "The Love Machine". The film would be the first starring Presley that had a ballad-free soundtrack since his 1956 film debut, Love Me Tender. Despite this, only 30,000 copies were sold, making it the worst selling record that Elvis ever released for RCA Victor.

Cast
 Elvis Presley as Ted Jackson
 Dodie Marshall as Jo Symington
 Pat Priest as Dina Bishop
 Pat Harrington, Jr. as Judd Whitman
 Skip Ward as Gil Carey
 Sandy Kenyon as Schwartz
 Frank McHugh as Captain Jack
 Ed Griffith as Cooper 
 Read Morgan as Ensign Tompkins
 Mickey Elley as Ensign Whitehead 
 Elaine Beckett as Vicki 
 Shari Nims as Mary 
 Diki Lerner as Zoltan
 Robert Isenberg as Artist
 Elsa Lanchester as Madame Neherina
Mickey Rooney as drunk man

Russ Tamblyn as uncredited yoga student

Production
Paramount originally intended to make a movie called Easy Come Easy Go starring Jan and Dean with director Barry Shear but it was cancelled when the stars and several crew were injured in a train crash.  The studio decided to use the same title, but a completely different plot. Principal photography began on October 3, 1966 and finished about a month later.

Soundtrack

Reception
Howard Thompson of The New York Times called the film "a tired little clinker that must have been shot during lunch hour" and also criticized it for only including "three measly songs. A pittance!" Variety was more positive, writing: "Good balance of script and songs, plus generally amusing performances by a competent, well-directed cast, add up to diverting entertainment." Roger Ebert gave the film one star out of four and wrote that it was "obviously produced with a minimum of care and with the sole purpose of contriving a plot, any plot, to fill in between when Elvis sings." Kevin Thomas of the Los Angeles Times wrote that the film was "aptly summed up in its title: easy to take, easy to forget. Always pleasant, occasionally just plain hokey, it sticks to the familiar Presley formula of songs, pretty girls and a slight plot."

References

External links
 
 

DVD Reviews
Review of the movie collection "Lights! Camera! Elvis! Collection (King Creole, Blue Hawaii, G.I. Blues, Fun in Acapulco, Roustabout, Girls! Girls! Girls!, Paradise, Hawaiian Style, Easy Come, Easy Go) by Paul Mavis at DVD Talk, August 6, 2007.
Review by Jeff Rosado at digitallyOBSESSED!, March 4, 2003.

1967 films
1967 musical films
Films directed by John Rich
Films produced by Hal B. Wallis
Paramount Pictures films
Treasure hunt films
Films featuring underwater diving
1960s English-language films